William Leo Nyhan (born March 13, 1926) is an American physician best known as the co-discoverer of Lesch–Nyhan syndrome.

Nyhan currently serves as professor of pediatrics at UC San Diego School of Medicine in La Jolla, California. He has held positions at Johns Hopkins School of Medicine and the University of Miami Leonard M. Miller School of Medicine and has served on a number of advisory committees, pediatric advisory boards, and research foundation boards.

Nyhan's areas of research span a variety of amino acid metabolism disorders, among them 4-hydroxybutyric aciduria, 3-methylglutaconyl-Co A hydratase deficiency, multiple carboxylase deficiency, methylmalonic acidemia, and propionic acidemia. He has studied the neuropathology of propionic acidemia, including the manifestation of basal ganglia infarction and its neurologic, non-metabolic presentation. Currently, he  conducts research into the causes of progressive neurologic disability caused by methylmalonic acidemia following liver transplantation.

He is involved in the ongoing development of tandem mass spectrometry for use in newborn screening and research. In addition, he is investigating the use of dichloroacetate to treat a broad range of mitochondrial diseases that lead to lactic acidemia.

See also
 Sakati–Nyhan–Tisdale syndrome
 Lesch–Nyhan syndrome

External links 
http://health.ucsd.edu/
 
 

Living people
1926 births
Johns Hopkins Hospital physicians
University of Miami faculty
University of California, San Diego faculty
Members of the National Academy of Medicine